Gary James Player DMS, OIG (born 1 November 1935) is a South African retired professional golfer who is widely considered to be one of the greatest golfers of all time. During his career, Player won nine major championships on the regular tour and nine major championships on the Champions Tour. At the age of 29, Player won the 1965 U.S. Open and became the only non-American to win all four majors in a career, known as the career Grand Slam. At the time, he was the youngest player to do this, though Jack Nicklaus (26) and Tiger Woods (24) subsequently broke this record. Player became only the third golfer in history to win the Career Grand Slam, following Ben Hogan and Gene Sarazen, and only Nicklaus and Woods have performed the feat since. He won over 150 professional tournaments on six continents over seven decades and was inducted into the World Golf Hall of Fame in 1974.

Nicknamed the Black Knight, Mr. Fitness, and the International Ambassador of Golf, he is also a renowned golf course architect with more than 400 design projects on five continents throughout the world.

Player has also authored or co-written 36 books on golf instruction, design, philosophy, motivation and fitness.

The Player Group operates The Player Foundation, which has a primary objective of promoting underprivileged education around the world. In 1983, The Player Foundation established the Blair Atholl Schools in Johannesburg, South Africa, which has educational facilities for more than 500 students from kindergarten through eighth grade. In 2013 it celebrated its 30th anniversary with charity golf events in London, Palm Beach, Shanghai and Cape Town, bringing its total of funds raised to over US$60 million.

On 7 January 2021, Player was awarded, the Presidential Medal of Freedom by United States President Donald Trump.

Background and family

Player was born in Johannesburg, South Africa, the youngest of Harry and Muriel Player's three children. When he was eight years old his mother died from cancer. Although his father was often away from home working in the gold mines, he did manage to take a loan in order to buy a set of clubs for Gary to begin playing golf. The Virginia Park golf course in Johannesburg is where Player first began his love affair with golf. At the age of 14, Player played his first round of golf and parred the first three holes. At age 16, he announced that he would become number one in the world. At age 17, he became a professional golfer.

Player married wife Vivienne Verwey (sister of professional golfer Bobby Verwey) on 19 January 1957, four years after turning professional. Together they had six children: Jennifer, Marc, Wayne, Michele, Theresa, and Amanda. He also has 22 grandchildren and 2 great-grandchildren. During the early days of his career Player would travel from tournament to tournament with his wife, six children, their nanny and a tutor in tow. Vivienne died of cancer in August 2021.

Player's eldest son, Marc, owns and operates The Player Group, which exclusively represents Player in all his commercial activities, including all endorsements, licensing, merchandising, golf course design, and real estate development.

Player is the brother of Ian Player, a South African environmental educator, activist and conservationist.

Playing career
Player is one of the most successful golfers in history, tied for fourth in major championship victories with nine. Along with Arnold Palmer and Jack Nicklaus he is often referred to as one of "The Big Three" golfers of his era – from the late 1950s through the late 1970s – when golf boomed in the United States and around the world and was greatly encouraged by expanded television coverage. Along with Gene Sarazen, Ben Hogan, Jack Nicklaus, and Tiger Woods, he is one of only five players to win golf's "career Grand Slam". He completed the Grand Slam in 1965 at the age of twenty-nine. Player was the second multiple majors winner from South Africa, following Bobby Locke, then was followed by Ernie Els, and Retief Goosen.

Player competed regularly on the U.S. based PGA Tour from the late 1950s. He led the Tour money list in 1961, and went on to accumulate 24 career Tour titles. He also played an exceptionally busy schedule all over the world, and he has been called the world's most traveled athlete.

He has more victories than anyone else in the South African Open (13) and the Australian Open (7). He held the record for most victories in the World Match Play Championship, with five wins, from 1973 until 1991 when this feat was equalled by Seve Ballesteros, finally losing his share of the record in 2004, when Ernie Els won the event for the sixth time. Player was in the top ten of Mark McCormack's world golf rankings from their inception in 1968 until 1981; he was ranked second in 1969, 1970 and 1972, each time to Jack Nicklaus.

He was the only player in the 20th century to win the British Open in three different decades. His first win, as a 23-year-old in 1959 at Muirfield, came after he double-bogeyed the last hole. In 1974, he became one of the few golfers in history to win two major championships in the same season. Player last won the Masters in 1978, when he started seven strokes behind 54-hole leader Hubert Green entering the final round, and won by one shot with birdies at seven of the last 10 holes for a back nine 30 and a final round 64. One week later, Player again came from seven strokes back in the final round to win the Tournament of Champions. In 1984, at the age of 48 Player nearly became the oldest ever major champion, finishing in second place behind Lee Trevino at the PGA Championship. And in gusty winds at the 1998 Masters, he became the oldest golfer ever to make the cut, breaking the 25-year-old record set by Sam Snead. Player credited this feat to his dedication to the concept of diet, health, practice and golf fitness.

Player has occasionally been accused of cheating, particularly in the 1974 Open; he has strongly denied the accusations. Later, at a skins game in Arizona in 1983, Tom Watson accused him of cheating by moving a leaf from behind his ball.

Being South African, Player never played in the Ryder Cup in which American and European golfers compete against each other. Regarding the event, Player remarked, "The things I have seen in the Ryder Cup have disappointed me. You are hearing about hatred and war." He was no longer an eligible player when the Presidents Cup was established to give international players the opportunity to compete in a similar event, but he was non-playing captain of the International Team for the Presidents Cup in 2003, which was held on a course he designed, The Links at Fancourt, in George, South Africa. After 2003 ended in a tie, he was reappointed as captain for the 2005 Presidents Cup, and his team lost to the Americans 15.5 to 18.5. Both Player and Jack Nicklaus were appointed to captain their respective teams again in 2007 in Canada; the United States won.

Augusta National green jacket
The green jacket is reserved for Augusta National members and golfers who win the Masters Tournament. Jackets are kept on club grounds, and taking them off the premises is forbidden. The exception is for the winner, who can take it home and return it to the club the following year. Player, who became the tournament's first international winner in 1961, said he did not know that. After winning, he packed the jacket and took it to his home in South Africa. That led to a call from club Chairman Clifford Roberts, who was a stickler for rules. "I didn't know you were supposed to leave it there," Player said. "Next thing you know, there was a call from Mr. Roberts."

Legacy
In 2000, Player was voted "Sportsman of the Century" in South Africa. In 1966, he was awarded the Bob Jones Award, the highest honour given by the United States Golf Association in recognition of distinguished sportsmanship in golf. He was inducted into the World Golf Hall of Fame in 1974. The "Gary Player – A Global Journey" exhibition was launched by the Hall of Fame as of March 2006.

In 2000, Golf Digest magazine ranked Player as the eighth greatest golfer of all time.

In 2002, Player was voted as the second greatest global golfer of all time by a panel of international media, golf magazines and fellow professionals conducted by the leading Golf Asia Magazine.

On 10 April 2009, he played for the last time in the Masters, where he was playing for his record 52nd time – every year since 1957 except for 1973, when he was recovering from surgery. After Nicklaus and Palmer, he was the last of the Big Three to retire from this tournament, which is a testament to his longevity.

At age 73 on 23 July 2009, Player competed in the Senior British Open Championship at Sunningdale Golf Club, 53 years after capturing his maiden European Tour victory at the Berkshire venue.

Augusta National Golf Club and the Masters announced on 5 July 2011 that Player had been invited to join Jack Nicklaus and Arnold Palmer as an honorary starter. The Big Three were reunited in this capacity starting with the 2012 tournament.

In July 2013, he became the oldest athlete ever to pose nude in ESPN The Magazines annual Body Issue to inspire people to keep looking after themselves throughout their lives whatever their age.

 Business and other interests 
Gary Player's business interests are exclusively represented by Black Knight International, which includes Gary Player Design, Player Real Estate, The Player Foundation, Gary Player Academies, and Black Knight Enterprises, aspects of which include licensing, events, publishing, wine, apparel and memorabilia. The Player Group, which operates The Player Foundation, is owned and managed by Marc Player.

The Player Foundation
The Player Foundation was established in 1983 by Marc Player and began as an effort to provide education, nutrition, medical care and athletic activities, for a small community of disadvantaged children living on the outskirts of Johannesburg, South Africa. The Player Foundation has since blossomed into an organisation that circles the globe bringing aid to underprivileged children and impoverished communities.  Since its establishment, The Player Foundation has donated over $65 million to the support of children's charities, the betterment of impoverished communities and the expansion of educational opportunities throughout the world.

The foundation is primarily funded by donations, grants and the four Gary Player Invitational events presented through Black Knight International and staged in the United States, China, Europe and South Africa annually. The Gary Player Invitational is a pro-am tournament that pairs celebrities and professional golfers from the PGA and Champions Tours with businessmen and other local participants. The proceeds of these tournaments and other special events provide funding for an ever-expanding number of institutions around the world, including the Blair Atholl Schools in South Africa, the Pleasant City Elementary School in Palm Beach and the Masizame Children's Shelter in Plettenberg Bay, South Africa.

Proceeds from the Gary Player Invitational have also been donated to the Lord's Taverners in the UK and the following organisations in South Africa; Wildlands Conservation Trust, Twilight Children and Bana Development Centre.

 Golf course design 
The Player Design firm have executed over 400 projects in 41 countries on five continents, including courses such as the Gary Player Country Club, Leopard Creek, Thracian Cliffs, Wentworth and The Links at Fancourt.The company offers three different design brands: Gary Player Design, Player Design, and Black Knight Design.

With golf accepted back into the 2016 Summer Olympics in Rio de Janeiro, Gary Player Design was selected among the finalists of an official RFP in early December 2011.

Nelson Mandela Invitational
Player hosted the Nelson Mandela Invitational golf tournament staged by Black Knight International from 2000. In October 2007, media attention arose about his involvement in the 2002 design of a golf course in Burma and as a result, the Nelson Mandela Children's Fund withdrew its support. Both Nelson Mandela and Archbishop Desmond Tutu accepted Player's position and statements on Burma. Player refused to withdraw as he and his son Marc personally built the golf event from scratch and issued a statement rebutting these claims via his website. The event continued to be staged annually at the Sun City Resort as the Gary Player Invitational until 2013.

Views
Views on apartheid
In 1966, Player espoused support for the apartheid policies of Hendrik Verwoerd in his book Grand Slam Golf, stating: "I must say now, and clearly, that I am of the South Africa of Verwoerd and apartheid ... a nation which ... is the product of its instinct and ability to maintain civilised values and standards amongst the alien barbarians. The African may well believe in witchcraft and primitive magic, practise ritual murder and polygamy; his wealth is in cattle". Activists publicly demonstrated against Player's espousal of apartheid, including protesting against Player at the 1969 PGA Championship. Australian activists also strongly protested against Player. In 1971 there were several threats to protest against Player at tournaments though they never came to fruition. Years later, in October 1974, Australian activists screamed at Player, "Go home racist", as he was lining up a putt on the 72nd hole in a tournament he had a chance to win.

However, in a 1987 interview with The Los Angeles Times, Player disavowed the system of apartheid, stating, "We have a terrible system in apartheid...it's almost a cancerous disease. I'm happy to say it's being eliminated....we've got to get rid of this apartheid." In an interview with Graham Bensinger, Player discussed his early support for apartheid stating that the South African Government had "pulled the wool over our eyes" and that the people were "brainwashed" into supporting these policies.

Other views
In July 2007, Player made statements at The Open Championship golf tournament about the use of performance-enhancing drugs in golf. He alleged that at least ten players were "taking something", citing human growth hormone, steroids and creatine as possible substances. Both the PGA Tour and European Tour were in the process of introducing random testing programmes at the time.

In June 2016, in an interview with bunkered.co.uk, Player branded as 'laughable' a report released by The R&A and USGA which said that driving distance in golf was only increasing minimally. He warned of a 'tsunami coming' due to the governing bodies' failure to address issues surrounding new golf technology. After the 2017 Alfred Dunhill Links Championship, Player reiterated these comments, taking to Twitter to say he was 'sad' to see the Old Course at St Andrews 'brought to her knees' after Ross Fisher broke the course record on a day of very low scoring during the final round.

Distinctions and honours
On 8 June 1961, Player was the guest on NBC's The Ford Show, Starring Tennessee Ernie Ford. In a comedy skit, he gives Tennessee Ernie Ford a golf lesson.
Received the 1966 Bob Jones Award from the United States Golf Association.
Named Honorary Member of the Royal and Ancient Golf Club of St Andrews in 1994.
Received Honorary Doctor of Laws Degree from University of St Andrews in 1995.
Received Honorary Doctor of Science from the University of Ulster, Northern Ireland in 1997
The WGC-Bridgestone Invitational trophy is named the Gary Player Cup.
Named Honorary Member of Carnoustie in 1999
Received Honorary Doctorate in Law, University of Dundee, Scotland in 1999
South African Sportsman of the Century award in 2000
Received the 2003 Laureus Lifetime Achievement Award at the Laureus World Sports Awards in Monte Carlo.
Awarded the Order of Ikhamanga (in gold for exceptional achievement) in 2003 by President Mbeki of South Africa for excellence in golf and contribution to non-racial sport in South Africa.
He was the world's first golfer to be featured on any country's postal stamp in South Africa.
Has designed over 400 golf courses on six continents around the world.
He currently plays on the U.S. Champions Tour and European Seniors Tour occasionally.
He received the 2006 Payne Stewart Award from the PGA Tour.
Played in his 52nd Masters Tournament at Augusta National in April 2009, extending his record of for most Masters appearances
Inducted into the African American Sports Hall of Fame in May 2007, with Lifetime Achievement Award
Has played in a record 46 consecutive British Open Championships, winning 3 times over 3 decades.
Stars with Camilo Villegas in a MasterCard "priceless foursome" television commercial launched during the U.S. Open in June 2009
In November 2009 he was awarded the inaugural Breeders Cup "Sports and Racing Excellence Award" at Santa Anita Park in California which honours owners and breeders of thoroughbred race horses.
Was inducted into the Asian Pacific Golf Hall of Fame with Jack Nicklaus in 2011 at a ceremony in Pattaya, Thailand.
In December 2011, Gary Player Design was selected amongst the finalists to design the golf course for the 2016 Olympic Games in Rio de Janeiro
He received the PGA Tour Lifetime Achievement Award at The Players Championship in May 2012. The first international person to receive this accolade.
Received the 2020 GCSAA Old Tom Morris Award from the Golf Course Superintendents Association of America 
Received the Presidential Medal of Freedom on 7 January 2021 from then President Donald Trump.

Professional wins (159)
PGA Tour wins (24)PGA Tour playoff record (3–10)European Tour wins (4)European Tour playoff record (0–2)Southern Africa wins (59)
Note: Many of these wins were part of a formal South Africa Tour or Sunshine Circuit (now Sunshine Tour).

 1955 East Rand Open
 1956 East Rand Open, South African Open
 1957 Western Province Open
 1958 Natal Open
 1959 East Rand Open, Natal Open, South African Professional Match Play Championship, Transvaal Open
 1960 Natal Open, South African Masters, Transvaal Open, Western Province Open, South African Open
 1961 Transvaal Open (Dec.)
 1962 Transvaal Open
 1963 Liquid Air Tournament, Richelieu Grand Prix (Cape Town), Richelieu Grand Prix (Johannesburg), Sponsored 5000
 1964 South African Masters
 1965 South African Open
 1966 Natal Open, Transvaal Open, South African Open
 1967 South African Masters, South African Open
 1968 Natal Open, Western Province Open, South African Open
 1969 South African PGA Championship, South African Open
 1971 General Motors Open, South African Masters, Western Province Open
 1972 South African Masters (Jan.), South African Masters (Dec.), Western Province Open, South African Open
 1974 General Motors Open (Feb.), South African Masters, General Motors Open (Nov.), Rand International Open,
 1975 General Motors Open, South African Open
 1976 South African Masters (Feb.), South African Masters (Nov.), South African Open 
 1977 ICL International, South African Open
 1979 South African PGA Championship, South African Masters, South African Open, Sun City Classic
 1981 South African Open
 1982 South African PGA Championship
 1986 Nissan Skins Game
 1988 Nissan Skins Game
 1991 Nissan Skins Game

PGA Tour of Australasia wins (2)PGA Tour of Australasia playoff record (0–1)Safari Circuit wins (1)

South American Golf Circuit wins (1)

Other European wins (10)

Sources:

Japan wins (2)

Other Australasian wins (17)

Sources:

Other South American wins (2)

Other wins (11)
1955 Egyptian Matchplay
1965 World Series of Golf, NTL Challenge Cup (Canada), World Cup of Golf, World Cup of Golf Individual Trophy
1968 World Series of Golf
1972 World Series of Golf
1977 World Cup of Golf Individual Trophy
1979 PGA Grand Slam of Golf (shared title with Andy North)
1983 Skins Game
1986 Fred Meyer Challenge (with Greg Norman - team shared title with Peter Jacobsen and Curtis Strange)

Senior PGA Tour wins (22)

*Note: The 1989 GTE North Classic was shortened to 36 holes due to rain.Senior PGA Tour playoff record (5–2)European Senior Tour wins (3)European Senior Tour playoff record (1–0)'

Other senior wins (6)
1987 Northville Invitational (United States), German PGA Team Championship 
1997 Dai-ichi Seimei Cup (Japan)
2000 Senior Skins Game (U.S. – unofficial event)
2009 Liberty Mutual Legends of Golf – Demaret Division (with Bob Charles)
2010 Liberty Mutual Legends of Golf – Demaret Division (with Bob Charles)

*The Senior British Open was retroactively recognised by the PGA Tour Champions as a senior major in 2018.

Major championships

Wins (9)

1Defeated Nagle in 18-hole playoff; Player 71 (+1), Nagle 74 (+4).

Results timeline

CUT = missed the halfway cut (3rd round cut in 1970, 1980, 1981 and 1985 Open Championships)
WD = withdrew
"T" indicates a tie for a place.

Summary

Most consecutive cuts made – 37 (1970 PGA – 1980 Masters)
Longest streak of top-10s – 6 (1962 PGA – 1964 Masters)

Results in The Players Championship

CUT = missed the halfway cut
"T" indicates a tie for a place

Senior major championships

Wins (9)

1Defeated Charles in 18-hole playoff; Player (68), Charles (70).
2Defeated Bland with a birdie on the second hole of a sudden-death playoff.

Results timeline

1The Senior Open Championship was not a Champions Tour major until 2003, though it was on the European Seniors Tour. Player won the event three times prior to this recognition.

CUT = Missed the half-way cut
NYF = Tournament not yet founded
"T" = tied

Team appearances
World Cup (representing South Africa): 1956, 1957, 1958, 1959, 1960, 1962, 1963, 1964, 1965 (winners, individual winner), 1966, 1967, 1968, 1971, 1972, 1973, 1977 (individual winner)
Slazenger Trophy (representing British Commonwealth and Empire): 1956
Chrysler Cup (representing the International team): 1986 (captain), 1987 (captain, winners), 1988 (captain), 1989 (captain), 1990 (captain), 1991, 1992, 1993, 1994 (winners)
Dunhill Cup (representing South Africa): 1991
Alfred Dunhill Challenge (representing Southern Africa): 1995 (non-playing captain, winners)
UBS Cup (representing the Rest of the World): 2001 (captain), 2002 (captain), 2004 (captain)
Insperity Invitational – Greats of Golf: 2012 (winners), 2014 (winners), 2015 (winners), 2017 (winners)

See also
Career Grand Slam champions
List of golfers with most Champions Tour major championship wins
List of golfers with most Champions Tour wins
List of golfers with most PGA Tour wins
List of longest PGA Tour win streaks
List of men's major championships winning golfers

Notes

References

External links

Gary Player Profile at Golf Legends
Gary Player Golf Course Design
Gary Player Foundation

South African male golfers
Sunshine Tour golfers
PGA Tour golfers
PGA Tour Champions golfers
Winners of men's major golf championships
Men's Career Grand Slam champion golfers
Winners of senior major golf championships
World Golf Hall of Fame inductees
Golf course architects
Golf writers and broadcasters
Laureus World Sports Awards winners
Recipients of the Order of Ikhamanga
Presidential Medal of Freedom recipients
BBC Sports Personality World Sport Star of the Year winners
Alumni of King Edward VII School (Johannesburg)
White South African people
South African people of British descent
Golfers from Johannesburg
People from Pixley ka Seme District Municipality
People from Jupiter Island, Florida
1935 births
Living people